Transition metal amino acid complexes are a large family of coordination complexes containing the conjugate bases of the amino acids, the 2-aminocarboxylates.  Amino acids are prevalent in nature, and all of them function as ligands toward the transition metals.   Not included in this article are complexes of the amides (including peptide) and ester derivatives of amino acids. Also excluded are the polyamino acids including the chelating agents EDTA and NTA.

Binding modes

Most commonly, amino acids coordinate to metal ions as N,O bidentate ligands, utilizing the amino group and the carboxylate.  They are "L-X" ligands.  A five-membered chelate ring is formed.  The chelate ring is only slightly ruffled at the sp3-hybridized carbon and nitrogen centers.

For those amino acids containing coordinating substituents, the resulting complexes are more structurally diverse since these substituents can coordinate.  Histidine, aspartic acid, methionine, and cysteine sometimes form tridentate N,N,O, N,O,O, S,N,O, and S,N,O complexes, respectively.

Using kinetically inert metal ions, complexes containing monodentate amino acids have been characterized.  These complexes exist in either the N or the O linkage isomers.  It can be assumed that such monodentate complexes exist transiently for many kinetically labile metal ions (e.g. Zn2+).

Stoichiometry and structure

Homoleptic complexes (only amino acid ligands)
Mixing simple metal salts with solutions of amino acids near neutral or elevated pH often affords bis- or tris complexes.  For metal ions that prefer octahedral coordination, these complexes often adopt the stoichiometry M(aa)3 (aa = amino carboxylate, such as glycinate, H2NCH2CO2−).

Complexes of the 3:1 stoichiometry have the formula is [M(O2CC(R)HNH2)3]z.  Such complexes adopt octahedral coordination geometry. These complexes can exist in facial and meridional isomers, both of which are chiral.  The stereochemical possibilities increase when the amino acid ligands are not homochiral.

Complexes with the 2:1 stoichiometry are illustrated by copper(II) glycinate [Cu(O2CC(R)HNH2)2], which exists both in anhydrous and pentacoordinate geometries.  When the metal is square planar, these complexes can exist as cis and trans isomers.  The stereochemical possibilities increase when the amino acid ligands are not homochiral. Homoleptic complexes are also known where the amino carboxylate is tridentate amino acids.  One such complex is Ni(κ3-histidinate)2.

Peptides and proteins
In addition to the amino acids, peptides and proteins bind metal cofactors through their side chains. For the most part, the α-amino and carboxylate groups are unavailable for binding as they are otherwise engaged in the peptide bond. The situation is more complicated for the N-terminal and O-terminal residues where the  α-amino and carboxylate groups are unavailable, respectively.  Especially important in this regard are histidine (imidazole), cysteine (thiolate), methionine (thioether).

Heteroleptic complexes (amino acids plus other ligands)

Mixed ligand complexes are common for amino acids.  Well known examples include [Co(en)2(glycinate)]2+, where en (ethylenediamine) is a spectator ligand.  In the area of organometallic complexes, one example of Cp*Ir(κ3-methionine).

Synthesis and reactions

A well studied complex is tris(glycinato)cobalt(III). Like several octahedral tris(amino carboxylate) complexes, it is isolated at a mixture of facial and meridional isomers.  It is produced by the reaction of glycine with sodium tris(carbonato)cobalt(III).

Commonly amino acid complexes are prepared by ligand displacement reactions of metal aquo complexes and the conjugate bases of amino acids:
[PtCl4]2-  +  2H2NCH(R)CO2−  →  [Pt(H2NCH(R)CO2)2]  +  4 Cl−

Relevant to bioinorganic chemistry, amino acid complexes can be generated by the hydrolysis of amino acid esters and amides (en = ethylenediamine):
[(en)2CoOH(κ1N-H2NCH(R)CO2Et)]2+  →  [(en)2CoOH(κ2NO-H2NCH(R)CO2)]2+  +  EtOH

Because their 5-membered MNC2O chelate ring is rather stable, amino acid complexes represent protecting groups for amino acids, allowing diverse reactions of the side chains.

Aminocarboxylate complexes

Organic compounds featuring two or more 2- and 3-aminocarboxylate groups are ligands of extensive use in nature, industry, and research.  Famous examples include EDTA and NTA.

References

Coordination chemistry